KMTX (105.3 FM, "Helena's Best Variety") is a radio station licensed to serve Helena, Montana. The station is owned by Kevin Terry, through licensee The Montana Radio Company, LLC. It airs an Adult Contemporary music format.

The station was assigned the KMTX-FM call letters by the Federal Communications Commission on March 7, 1984. The station changed its call sign to the current KMTX on December 31, 2014.

References

External links
KMTX official website

MTX
Mainstream adult contemporary radio stations in the United States
Lewis and Clark County, Montana
Radio stations established in 1985
1985 establishments in Montana